HD 131399 is a star system in the constellation of Centaurus. Based on the system's electromagnetic spectrum, it is located around 351 light-years (107.9 parsecs) away. The total apparent magnitude is 7.07, but because of interstellar dust between it and the Earth, it appears 0.22 ± 0.09 magnitudes dimmer than it should be.

The brightest star, is a young A-type main-sequence star, and further out are two lower-mass stars. A Jupiter-mass planet or a low-mass brown dwarf was once thought to be orbiting the central star, but this has been ruled out.

Stellar system
The brightest star in the HD 131399 system is designated HD 131399 A. Its spectral type is A1V, and it is 2.08 times as massive as the Sun. The two lower-mass stars are designated HD 131399 B and C, respectively. B is a G-type main-sequence star, while HD 131399 C is a K-type main-sequence star. Both stars are less massive than the Sun.

HD 131399 B and C are located very close to each other, and the two orbit each other at about 10 AU. In turn, the B-C pair orbits the central star A at a distance of 349 astronomical units (au). This orbit takes about 3,600 years to complete, and it has an eccentricity of about 0.13 The entire system is about 21.9 million years old.

HD 131399 A has been described as a "nascent Am star"; although it has a very slow projected rotation rate and would be expected to show chemical peculiarities, its spectrum is relatively normal, possibly due to its young age.

Planetary system

The claimed discovery of a massive planet, named HD 131399 Ab, was announced in a paper published in the journal Science. The object was imaged using the SPHERE imager of the Very Large Telescope at the European Southern Observatory, located in the Atacama Desert of Chile, and announced in a July 2016 paper in the journal Science. This was the first exoplanet candidate to be discovered by SPHERE. The image was created from two separate SPHERE observations: one to image the three stars and one to detect the faint planet. After its discovery, the team unofficially named the system "Scorpion-1" and the planet "Scorpion-1b", after the survey that prompted its discovery, the Scorpion Planet Survey (principal investigator: Daniel Apai).

In May 2017, observations made by the Gemini Planet Imager and including a reanalysis of the SPHERE data suggest that this target is, in fact, a background star. This object's spectrum seems to be like that of a K-type or M-type dwarf, not a T-type object as first thought. It also initially appeared to be associated with HD 131399, but this was because of its unusually high proper motion (in the top 4% fastest-moving stars). After subsequent data published in 2022 confirmed that the object is a background star, the paper announcing the putative discovery was retracted.

Characteristics
Its atmosphere was shown to contain both water and methane through the use of near-infrared spectroscopy (1.4-1.6 μm). Scientists believed it was unlikely that the planet harbored life due to it being gaseous. The planet was said to have "no liquid water, extremely powerful winds, and no surface; just below the uppermost layer of the atmosphere it rains liquid iron droplets." One orbit of HD 131399 Ab was thought to take 550 years.

References

Notes

Centaurus (constellation)
Hypothetical planetary systems
Triple star systems
A-type main-sequence stars
G-type main-sequence stars
K-type main-sequence stars
Durchmusterung objects
131399
072940